The Football League play-offs for the 2005–06 season were held in May 2006, with the finals taking place at Millennium Stadium in Cardiff for the last time. The play-off semi-finals were played over two legs and were contested by the teams who finished in 3rd, 4th, 5th and 6th place in the Football League Championship and League One and the 4th, 5th, 6th and 7th placed teams in the League Two table. The winners of the semi-finals advanced to the finals, with the winners of these matches gaining promotion for the following season.

Background
The Football League play-offs have been held every year since 1987. They take place for each division following the conclusion of the regular season and are contested by the four clubs finishing below the automatic promotion places.

In the Championship, Watford, who were aiming to return to the top flight for the first time since 2000, finished 9 points behind second placed Sheffield United, who in turn finished 16 points behind champions Reading, who were promoted to the top flight for the first time in the club's history. Preston North End who missed out on promotion from playoffs the season before and have not been in the top flight since 1961, finished in fourth place in the table. Leeds United who are aiming to bounce back to the Premier League at the second attempt, finished in fifth place. Crystal Palace finished 3 points behind Leeds United and were looking for a place back in the Premiership after relegation on final day of last season.

Championship

Semi-finals
First leg

Second leg

Leeds United win 3–1 on aggregate.

Watford won 3–0 on aggregate.

Final

League One

Semi-finals
First leg

Second leg

Swansea City won 3–1 on aggregate.

Barnsley won 3–2 on aggregate.

Final

League Two

Semi-finals
First leg

Second leg

Grimsby Town won 3–1 on aggregate.

Cheltenham Town won 2–1 on aggregate.

Final

External links
Football League website

 
English Football League play-offs
May 2006 sports events in Europe